PPHI may refer to:
 Post-Polio Health International, US-based polio survivors' support organisation
People’s Primary Healthcare Initiative KP, Health initiative in Pakistan
Peninsula Postgraduate Health Institute, provider of medical education in Devon and Cornwall, England